William Arthur Zitzmann (November 19, 1895 – May 29, 1985) was a professional baseball outfielder. He played all or part of six seasons in Major League Baseball, between 1919 and 1929, for the Pittsburgh Pirates and Cincinnati Reds. He batted right-handed and also threw right-handed. He weighed 175 lbs. He was born on November 19, 1895 in Long Island City, New York. He died on May 29, 1985 in Passaic, New Jersey.

In 406 games over six seasons, Zitzmann posted a .267 batting average (268-for-1004) with 197 runs, 3 home runs, 89 RBI, 42 stolen bases and 83 bases on balls.

External links

Major League Baseball outfielders
Cincinnati Reds players
Pittsburgh Pirates players
Jersey City Skeeters players
Newark Bears (IL) players
Dominion Hawks players
Baseball players from New York (state)
1895 births
1985 deaths
People from Long Island City, Queens